This is a list of small arms—including pistols, shotguns, sniper rifles, submachine guns, personal defense weapons, assault rifles, battle rifles, designated marksman rifles, carbines, machine guns, flamethrowers, multiple-barrel firearms, grenade launchers, and anti-tank rifles—that includes variants.

List 

Sarsılmaz 

Schwarz chest plate gun (United States - - :Chest plate mounted "machine gun")
Société Alsacienne de Constructions Mécaniques de Cholet
 Pistols
SCAM modèle 1935A	(France - Semi-Automatic Pistol - 7.65×20mm Longue: SIG Sauer P210 Variant)
 Safir Arms
 Rifles
 Safir T-15	(Republic of Turkey - Semi-Automatic Carbine - 5.56×45mm NATO)
 Safir T-16	(Republic of Turkey - Carbine - 5.56×45mm NATO)
 Safir T-17	(Republic of Turkey - Assault Rifle - 5.56×45mm NATO)
 Shotguns
 Safir T-14	(Republic of Turkey - Semi-Automatic Shotgun - .410 Bore)
 Saurio S.A.
 Saurio mod. 300 ( - Shotgun - )
 Saurio mod. 500 ( - Pistol - .22LR)
 Saurio mod. 600 ( - Semi Automatic Rifle - .22LR)
 Saurio mod. 700 ( - Lever Action Rifle - .22LR)
 Shooters Arms
 SAS-12  (Philippines - Shotgun - 12 Gauge)
 Smith & Wesson
 Pistols
 S&W .45 Limited	(US - Semi-Automatic Pistol - .45 ACP)
 S&W .45 Recon	(US - Semi-Automatic Pistol - .45 ACP)
 S&W Bodyguard .380	(US - Semi-Automatic Pistol - .380ACP)
 S&W M&P	(US - Semi-Automatic Pistol - Various)
 S&W M&P9 Bodyguard 380	(US - Semi-Automatic Pistol - .380 ACP)
 S&W M&P Compact	(US - Semi-Automatic Pistol - 9×19mm Parabellum, .357 SIG, .40 S&W)
 S&W M&P Full Size	(US - Semi-Automatic Pistol - 9×19mm Parabellum, .357 SIG, .40 S&W)
 S&W M&P Mid-Size	(US - Semi-Compact Semi-Automatic Pistol - 9×19mm Parabellum, .357 SIG, .40 S&W)
 S&W M&P Shield	(US - Semi-Automatic Pistol - 9×19mm Parabellum, .40 S&W)
 S&W M&P9	(US - Semi-Automatic Pistol - 9×19mm Parabellum)
 S&W M&P9 Pro Series	(US - Semi-Automatic Pistol - 9×19mm Parabellum)
 S&W M&P9 Pro Series 5"	(US - Semi-Automatic Pistol - 9×19mm Parabellum)
 S&W M&P9L	(US - Semi-Automatic Pistol - 9×19mm Parabellum)
 S&W M&P22	(US - Semi-Automatic Pistol - .22 Long Rifle)
 S&W M&P40	(US - Semi-Automatic Pistol - .40 S&W)
 S&W M&P40 Pro Series	(US - Semi-Automatic Pistol - .40 S&W)
 S&W M&P40 Pro Series 5"	(US - Semi-Automatic Pistol - .40 S&W)
 S&W M&P45	(US - Semi-Automatic Pistol - .45 ACP)
 S&W M&P45 Full Size	(US - Semi-Automatic Pistol - .45 ACP)
 S&W M&P45 Mid-Size	(US - Semi-Compact Semi-Automatic Pistol - .45 ACP)
 S&W M&P45c	(US - Compact Semi-Automatic Pistol - .45 ACP)
 S&W Model 22A	(US - Semi-Automatic Pistol - .22 Long Rifle)
 S&W Model 22S	(US - Semi-Automatic Pistol - .22 Long Rifle)
 S&W Model 39	(US - Semi-Automatic Pistol - 9×19mm Parabellum, .40 S&W)
 S&W Model 3566	(US - Semi-Automatic Pistol - .356 TSW)
 S&W Model 41	(US - Semi-Automatic Pistol - .22 Long Rifle)
 S&W Model 46	(US - Semi-Automatic Pistol - .22 Long Rifle)
 S&W Model 44	(US - Semi-Automatic Pistol - 9×19mm Parabellum)
 S&W Model 52	(US - Semi-Automatic Pistol - .38 S&W Special Wadcutter)
 S&W Model 52A	(US - Semi-Automatic Pistol - .38 AMU)
 S&W Model 59	(US - Semi-Automatic Pistol - 9×19mm Parabellum Parabellum)
 S&W Model 459	(US - Semi-Automatic Pistol - 9×19mm Parabellum)
 S&W Model 62	(US - Semi-Automatic Pistol - .45 ACP)
 S&W Model 147A	(US - Semi-Automatic Pistol - 9×19mm Parabellum)
 S&W Model 410	(US - Semi-Automatic Pistol - .40 S&W)
 S&W Model 411	(US - Semi-Automatic Pistol - .40 S&W)
 S&W Model 422	(US - Semi-Automatic Pistol - .22 Long Rifle)
 S&W Model 61	(US - Semi-Automatic Pistol - .22 Long Rifle)
 S&W Model 622	(US - Semi-Automatic Pistol - .22 Long Rifle)
 S&W Model 2206	(US - Semi-Automatic Pistol - .22 Long Rifle)
 S&W Model 2213	(US - Semi-Automatic Pistol - .22 Long Rifle)
 S&W Model 2214	(US - Semi-Automatic Pistol - .22 Long Rifle)
 S&W Model 439	(US - Semi-Automatic Pistol - 9×19mm Parabellum)
 S&W Model 457	(US - Semi-Automatic Pistol - .45 ACP)
 S&W Model 469	(US - Compact Semi-Automatic Pistol - 9×19mm Parabellum)
 S&W Model 539	(US - Semi-Automatic Pistol - 9×19mm Parabellum)
 S&W Model 559	(US - Semi-Automatic Pistol - 9×19mm Parabellum)
 S&W Model 639	(US - Semi-Automatic Pistol - 9×19mm Parabellum)
 S&W Model 645	(US - Semi-Automatic Pistol - .45 ACP)
 S&W Model 745	(US - Semi-Automatic Pistol - .45 ACP)
 S&W Model 659	(US - Semi-Automatic Pistol - 9×19mm Parabellum)
 S&W Model 669	(US - Semi-Automatic Pistol - 9×19mm Parabellum)
 S&W Model 845	(US - Semi-Automatic Pistol - .45 ACP)
 S&W Model 910	(US - Semi-Automatic Pistol - 9×19mm Parabellum)
 S&W Model 908	(US - Compact Semi-Automatic Pistol - 9×19mm Parabellum)
 S&W Model 909	(US - Semi-Automatic Pistol - 9×19mm Parabellum)
 S&W Model 915	(US - Semi-Automatic Pistol - 9×19mm Parabellum)
 S&W Model 945	(US - Semi-Automatic Pistol - .40 S&W, .45 ACP)
 S&W Model 952	(US - Semi-Automatic Pistol - 9×19mm Parabellum)
 S&W Model 1006	(US - Semi-Automatic Pistol - 10mm Auto)
 S&W Model 1026	(US - Semi-Automatic Pistol - 10mm Auto)
 S&W Model 1046	(US - Semi-Automatic Pistol - 10mm Auto)
 S&W Model 1066	(US - Semi-Automatic Pistol - 10mm Auto)
 S&W Model 1076	(US - Semi-Automatic Pistol - 10mm Auto)
 S&W Model 1086	(US - Semi-Automatic Pistol - 10mm Auto)
 S&W Model 3904	(US - Semi-Automatic Pistol - 9×19mm Parabellum)
 S&W Model 3906	(US - Semi-Automatic Pistol - 9×19mm Parabellum)
 S&W Model 3913	(US - Semi-Automatic Pistol - 9×19mm Parabellum)
 S&W Model 3913TSW	(US - Semi-Automatic Pistol - 9×19mm Parabellum)
 S&W Model 3914	(US - Semi-Automatic Pistol - 9×19mm Parabellum)
 S&W Model 3953	(US - Semi-Automatic Pistol - 9×19mm Parabellum)
 S&W Model 3953TSW	(US - Semi-Automatic Pistol - 9×19mm Parabellum)
 S&W Model 3954	(US - Semi-Automatic Pistol - 9×19mm Parabellum)
 S&W Model 3958	(US - Semi-Automatic Pistol - 9×19mm Parabellum)
 S&W Model 4003	(US - Semi-Automatic Pistol - .40 S&W)
 S&W Model 4003TSW	(US - Semi-Automatic Pistol - .40 S&W)
 S&W Model 4004	(US - Semi-Automatic Pistol - .40 S&W)
 S&W Model 4006	(US - Semi-Automatic Pistol - .40 S&W)
 S&W Model 4006TSW	(US - Semi-Automatic Pistol - .40 S&W)
 S&W Model 4013	(US - Semi-Automatic Pistol - .40 S&W)
 S&W Model 4013TSW	(US - Semi-Automatic Pistol - .40 S&W)
 S&W Model 4014	(US - Semi-Automatic Pistol - .40 S&W)
 S&W Model 4026	(US - Semi-Automatic Pistol - .40 S&W)
 S&W Model 4040	(US - Semi-Automatic Pistol - .40 S&W)
 S&W Model 4043	(US - Semi-Automatic Pistol - .40 S&W)
 S&W Model 4043TSW	(US - Semi-Automatic Pistol - .40 S&W)
 S&W Model 4044	(US - Semi-Automatic Pistol - .40 S&W)
 S&W Model 4046	(US - Semi-Automatic Pistol - .40 S&W)
 S&W Model 4046TSW	(US - Semi-Automatic Pistol - .40 S&W)
 S&W Model 4053	(US - Semi-Automatic Pistol - .40 S&W)
 S&W Model 4053TSW	(US - Semi-Automatic Pistol - .40 S&W)
 S&W Model 4054	(US - Semi-Automatic Pistol - .40 S&W)
 S&W Model 4056TSW	(US - Semi-Automatic Pistol - .40 S&W)
 S&W Model 4506	(US - Semi-Automatic Pistol - .45 ACP)
 S&W Model 4505	(US - Semi-Automatic Pistol - .45 ACP)
 S&W Model 4516	(US - Semi-Automatic Pistol - .45 ACP)
 S&W Model 4546	(US - Semi-Automatic Pistol - .45 ACP)
 S&W Model 4563	(US - Semi-Automatic Pistol - .45 ACP)
 S&W Model 4563TSW	(US - Semi-Automatic Pistol - .45 ACP)
 S&W Model 4566	(US - Semi-Automatic Pistol - .45 ACP)
 S&W Model 4566TSW	(US - Semi-Automatic Pistol - .45 ACP)
 S&W Model 4567	(US - Semi-Automatic Pistol - .45 ACP)
 S&W Model 4586	(US - Semi-Automatic Pistol - .45 ACP)
 S&W Model 4586TSW	(US - Semi-Automatic Pistol - .45 ACP)
 S&W Model 4513TSW	(US - Semi-Automatic Pistol - .45 ACP)
 S&W Model 4526	(US - Semi-Automatic Pistol - .45 ACP)
 S&W Model 4536	(US - Semi-Automatic Pistol - .45 ACP)
 S&W Model 4553TSW	(US - Semi-Automatic Pistol - .45 ACP)
 S&W Model 4556	(US - Semi-Automatic Pistol - .45 ACP)
 S&W Model 4576	(US - Semi-Automatic Pistol - .45 ACP)
 S&W Model 4583TSW	(US - Semi-Automatic Pistol - .45 ACP)
 S&W Model 4596	(US - Semi-Automatic Pistol - .45 ACP)
 S&W Model 5903	(US - Semi-Automatic Pistol - 9×19mm Parabellum)
 S&W Model 5903TSW	(US - Semi-Automatic Pistol - 9×19mm Parabellum)
 S&W Model 5904	(US - Semi-Automatic Pistol - 9×19mm Parabellum)
 S&W Model 5905	(US - Semi-Automatic Pistol - 9×19mm Parabellum)
 S&W Model 5906	(US - Semi-Automatic Pistol - 9×19mm Parabellum)
 S&W Model 5906TSW	(US - Semi-Automatic Pistol - 9×19mm Parabellum)
 S&W Model 5924	(US - Semi-Automatic Pistol - 9×19mm Parabellum)
 S&W Model 5926	(US - Semi-Automatic Pistol - 9×19mm Parabellum)
 S&W Model 5943	(US - Semi-Automatic Pistol - 9×19mm Parabellum)
 S&W Model 5943TSW	(US - Semi-Automatic Pistol - 9×19mm Parabellum)
 S&W Model 5944	(US - Semi-Automatic Pistol - 9×19mm Parabellum)
 S&W Model 5946	(US - Semi-Automatic Pistol - 9×19mm Parabellum)
 S&W Model 5946TSW	(US - Semi-Automatic Pistol - 9×19mm Parabellum)
 S&W Model 5967	(US - Semi-Automatic Pistol - 9×19mm Parabellum)
 S&W Model 6904	(US - Semi-Automatic Pistol - 9×19mm Parabellum)
 S&W Model 6906	(US - Semi-Automatic Pistol - 9×19mm Parabellum)
 S&W Model 6924	(US - Semi-Automatic Pistol - 9×19mm Parabellum)
 S&W Model 6926	(US - Semi-Automatic Pistol - 9×19mm Parabellum)
 S&W Model 6944	(US - Semi-Automatic Pistol - 9×19mm Parabellum)
 S&W Model 6946	(US - Semi-Automatic Pistol - 9×19mm Parabellum)
 S&W Model CQB	(US - Semi-Automatic Pistol - .45 ACP)
 S&W Model CS9	(US - Semi-Automatic Pistol - 9×19mm Parabellum)
 S&W Model CS40	(US - Semi-Automatic Pistol - .40 S&W)
 S&W Model CS45	(US - Semi-Automatic Pistol - .45 ACP)
 S&W Shorty Forty	(US - Semi-Automatic Pistol - .40 S&W)
 S&W Shorty 45	(US - Semi-Automatic Pistol - .45 ACP)
 S&W Sigma	(US - Semi-Automatic Pistol - 9×19mm Parabellum, .357 SIG, .380, .40 S&W)
 S&W SW9	(US - Semi-Automatic Pistol - 9×19mm Parabellum)
 S&W SW9C	(US - Semi-Automatic Pistol - 9×19mm Parabellum)
 S&W SW9E	(US - Semi-Automatic Pistol - 9×19mm Parabellum)
 S&W SW9F	(US - Semi-Automatic Pistol - 9×19mm Parabellum)
 S&W SW9G	(US - Semi-Automatic Pistol - 9×19mm Parabellum)
 S&W SW9M	(US - Semi-Automatic Pistol - 9×19mm Parabellum)
 S&W SW9P	(US - Semi-Automatic Pistol - 9×19mm Parabellum)
 S&W SW9V	(US - Semi-Automatic Pistol - 9×19mm Parabellum)
 S&W SW9VE	(US - Semi-Automatic Pistol - 9×19mm Parabellum)
 S&W SW40	(US - Semi-Automatic Pistol - .40 S&W)
 S&W SW40C	(US - Semi-Automatic Pistol - .40 S&W)
 S&W SW40E	(US - Semi-Automatic Pistol - .40 S&W)
 S&W SW40F	(US - Semi-Automatic Pistol - .40 S&W)
 S&W SW40V	(US - Semi-Automatic Pistol - .40 S&W)
 S&W SW40VE	(US - Semi-Automatic Pistol - .40 S&W)
 S&W SW357V	(US - Semi-Automatic Pistol - .357 SIG)
 S&W SW380M	(US - Subcompact Semi-Automatic Pistol - .380 ACP)
 S&W Single-Shot	(US - Single-Shot Pistol - Various)
 S&W First Model Single-Shot	(US - Single-Shot Pistol - .22 Long Rifle, .32 S&W, .38 S&W)
 S&W Second Model Single-Shot	(US - Single-Shot Pistol - .22 Long Rifle)
 S&W Third Model Single-Shot	(US - Single-Shot Pistol - .22 Long Rifle)
 S&W Fourth Model Single-Shot	(US - Single-Shot Pistol - .22 Long Rifle)
 S&W Super 9	(US - Semi-Automatic Pistol - 9×19mm Parabellum, 9×21mm IMI, .356 TSW)
 S&W SW99	(US - Semi-Automatic Pistol - 9×19mm Parabellum, .40 S&W, .45 ACP)
 S&W SW99C	(US - Compact Semi-Automatic Pistol - 9×19mm Parabellum, .40 S&W)
 S&W SW99QA	(US - Semi-Automatic Pistol - 9×19mm Parabellum, .40 S&W, .45 ACP)
 S&W SW990	(US - Semi-Automatic Pistol - 9×19mm Parabellum, .40 S&W, .45 ACP)
 S&W SW990L	(US - Semi-Automatic Pistol - 9×19mm Parabellum, .40 S&W, .45 ACP)
 S&W SW990L Compact	(US - Compact Semi-Automatic Pistol - 9×19mm Parabellum, .40 S&W, .45 ACP)
 S&W SW1911	(US - Semi-Automatic Pistol - .38 Super Automatic, .45 ACP)
 Thompson-Center Contender	(United States - Single-Shot Break Action Pistol - Various)
 Revolvers
 S&W Number 1	(US - Single-Action Revolver - .22 Short Blackpowder)
 S&W Number 1½	(US - Single-Action Revolver - .32 Rimfire )
 S&W Number 2	(US - Single-Action Revolver - .32 Long Rimfire)
 S&W Number 3 Pocket Pistol	(US - Compact Single-Action Revolver - .41 S&W Rimfire)
 S&W .22 Ladysmith	(US - Single-Action Revolver - .22 Long)
 S&W .22/32 Hand Ejector	(US - Single-Action Revolver - .22 Long Rifle)
 S&W .22/32 Target Model	(US - Single-Action Revolver - .22 Long Rifle)
 S&W Model of 1953 .22/32 Target	(US - Single-Action Revolver - .22 Long Rifle)
 S&W Model of 1953 .22/32 Kit Gun	(US - Single-Action Revolver - .22 Long Rifle)
 S&W Model of 1955 .22/32 Kit Gun Airweight	(US - Single-Action Revolver - .22 Long Rifle)
 S&W .32 Double Action	(US - Double-Action Revolver - .32 S&W Blackpowder)
 S&W .32 Safety Hammerless (US - Revolver - .32 S&W Blackpowder)
 S&W .32 Single Action	(US - Single-Action Revolver - .32 S&W Blackpowder)
 S&W .32-20 Hand Ejector	(US - Single-Action Revolver - .32-20 Winchester)
 S&W .32-20 Hand Ejector Model of 1902	(US - Single-Action Revolver - .32-20 Winchester)
 S&W .32-20 Hand Ejector Model of 1905	(US - Single-Action Revolver - .32-20 Winchester)
 S&W .38 Chief's Special	(US - Single-Action Revolver - .38 S&W Special)
 S&W Aircrewman	(US - Single-Action Revolver - .38 S&W Special)
 S&W .38 DA Perfected	(US - Double-Action Revolver - .38 S&W Blackpowder)
 S&W .38 Double Action	(US - Double-Action Revolver - .38 S&W Blackpowder)
 S&W .32 Hand Ejector	(US - Single-Action Revolver - .32 S&W Long: Model 1896)
 S&W .32 Hand Ejector Model of 1903	(US - Single-Action Revolver - .32 S&W Long)
 S&W .32 Regulation Police	(US - Single-Action Revolver - .32 S&W Long)
 S&W .38/32 Terrier	(US - Single-Action Revolver - .38 S&W Long)
 S&W .38 Military & Police	(US - Single-Action Revolver - .38 Long Colt, .38 S&W Special)
 S&W .38 Military & Police Model of 1902	(US - Single-Action Revolver - .38 S&W Special)
 S&W .38 Military & Police Model of 1905	(US - Single-Action Revolver - .38 S&W Special)
 S&W .38 Military & Police Victory Model	(US - Single-Action Revolver - .38 S&W Special)
 S&W .38 Military & Police Airweight	(US - Single-Action Revolver - .38 S&W Special)
 S&W M13 Aircrewman	(US - Single-Action Revolver - .38 S&W Special)
 S&W .38 Safety Hammerless	(US - Single-Action Revolver - .38 S&W Blackpowder)
 S&W .38 Single Action	(US - Single-Action Revolver - .38 S&W Blackpowder)
 S&W .38 Winchester Double Action	(US - Double-Action Revolver - .38-40 Winchester)
 S&W .38/44 Heavy Duty	(US - Double-Action Revolver - .38 S&W Special)
 S&W .38/44 Outdoorsman	(US - Double-Action Revolver - .38 S&W Special)
 S&W .44 Double Action	(US - Double-Action Revolver - .44 Russian)
 S&W .44 Double Action Frontier	(US - Double-Action Revolver - .44-40 Winchester)
 S&W .44 Hand Ejector First Model	(US - Double-Action Revolver - .44 S&W Special)
 S&W New Century	(US - Double-Action Revolver - .44 S&W Special)
 S&W Triplz Lock	(US - Double-Action Revolver - .38-40 Winchester, .44 Russian, .44 S&W Special, .44-40 Winchester, .45 Schofield, .45 Colt, .455 Mark II)
 S&W .44 Military Model of 1908	(US - Double-Action Revolver - .44 S&W Special)
 S&W .44 Hand Ejector Second Model	(US - Double-Action Revolver - .38-40 Winchester, .44 S&W Special, .44-40 Winchester, .45 Colt)
 S&W .44 Hand Ejector Third Model	(US - Double-Action Revolver - .44 S&W Special, .44-40 Winchester, .45 Colt)
 S&W .44 Magnum	(US - Double-Action Revolver - .44 Remington Magnum)
 S&W .45 Hand Ejector US Service Model of 1917	(US - Double-Action Revolver - .45 ACP)
 S&W Model of 1917 Army	(US - Double-Action Revolver - .45 ACP)
 S&W Model of 1950	(US - Double-Action Revolver - .45 ACP & .45 Colt)
 S&W Model of 1955 .45 Target	(US - Double-Action Revolver - .45 ACP)
 S&W .357 Combat Magnum	(US - Double-Action Revolver - .357 Magnum)
 S&W .455 Mark II Hand Ejector	(US - Double-Action Revolver - .45 Colt, .455 Mark II)
 S&W Model of 1926 .44 Military	(US - Double-Action Revolver - .44 S&W Special)
 S&W Model of 1950 .44 Military	(US - Double-Action Revolver - .44 S&W Special)
 S&W .44 Hand Ejector Fourth Model Target	(US - Double-Action Revolver - .44 S&W Special)
 S&W American	(US - Single-Action Revolver - .44 Henry, .44 S&W American)
 S&W Russian	(US - Single-Action Revolver - .44 Henry, .44 Russian)
 S&W Schofield	(US - Single-Action Revolver - .45 Schofield)
 S&W Bodyguard Airweight	(US - Double-Action Revolver - .38 S&W Special)
 S&W Centennial	(US - Double-Action Revolver - .38 S&W Special)
 S&W K-22	(US - Double-Action Revolver - .22 Long Rifle)
 S&W .22 Military & Police	(US - Double-Action Revolver - .22 Long Rifle)
 S&W K-32	(US - Double-Action Revolver - .32 S&W Long)
 S&W .32 Military & Police	(US - Double-Action Revolver - .32 S&W Long)
 S&W K-38	(US - Double-Action Revolver - .38 S&W Special)
 S&W K-200	(US - Double-Action Revolver - .38/200, .38 S&W Long)
 S&W Highway Patrolman	(US - Double-Action Revolver - .357 S&W Magnum)
 S&W Model 10	(US - Double-Action Revolver - .38 S&W Special)
 S&W Model 11	(US - Double-Action Revolver - .38/200, .38 S&W)
 S&W Model 12	(US - Double-Action Revolver - .38 S&W Special)
 S&W Model 13	(US - Double-Action Revolver - .357 S&W Magnum)
 S&W Model 14	(US - Double-Action Revolver - .38 S&W Special)
 S&W Model 15	(US - Double-Action Revolver - .38 S&W Special)
 S&W Model 16	(US - Double-Action Revolver - .32 S&W Long)
 S&W Model 16-4	(US - Double-Action Revolver - .32 H&R Magnum)
 S&W Model 17	(US - Double-Action Revolver - .22 Long Rifle)
 S&W Model 18	(US - Double-Action Revolver - .22 Long Rifle)
 S&W Model 19	(US - Double-Action Revolver - .357 S&W Magnum)
 S&W Model 20	(US - Double-Action Revolver - .38 S&W Special)
 S&W Model 21	(US - Double-Action Revolver - .44 S&W Special)
 S&W Model 22	(US - Double-Action Revolver - .45 ACP)
 S&W Model 23	(US - Double-Action Revolver - .38 S&W Special)
 S&W Model 24	(US - Double-Action Revolver - .44 S&W Special)
 S&W Model 25-2	(US - Double-Action Revolver - .45 ACP)
 S&W Model 25-5	(US - Double-Action Revolver - .45 Colt)
 S&W Model 26	(US - Double-Action Revolver - .45 ACP)
 S&W Model 27	(US - Double-Action Revolver - .357 S&W Magnum)
 S&W Model 28	(US - Double-Action Revolver - .357 S&W Magnum)
 S&W Model 29	(US - Double-Action Revolver - .44 Remington Magnum)
 S&W Model 30	(US - Double-Action Revolver - .32 S&W Long)
 S&W Model 31	(US - Double-Action Revolver - .32 S&W Long)
 S&W Model 32	(US - Double-Action Revolver - .38 S&W)
 S&W Model 33	(US - Double-Action Revolver - .38 S&W)
 S&W Model 34	(US - Double-Action Revolver - .22 Long Rifle)
 S&W Model 35	(US - Double-Action Revolver - .22 Long Rifle)
 S&W Model 36	(US - Double-Action Revolver - .38 S&W Special)
 S&W Model 37	(US - Double-Action Revolver - .38 S&W Special)
 S&W Model 38	(US - Double-Action Revolver - .38 S&W Special)
 S&W Model 40	(US - Double-Action Revolver - .38 S&W Special)
 S&W Model 42	(US - Double-Action Revolver - .38 S&W Special)
 S&W Model 43	(US - Double-Action Revolver - .22 Long Rifle)
 S&W Model 45	(US - Double-Action Revolver - .22 Long Rifle)
 S&W Model 48	(US - Double-Action Revolver - .22 Winchester Magnum Rimfire:)
 S&W Model 49	(US - Double-Action Revolver - .38 S&W Special)
 S&W Model 50	(US - Double-Action Revolver - .38 S&W Special)
 S&W Model 51	(US - Double-Action Revolver - .22 Winchester Magnum Rimfire)
 S&W Model 53	(US - Double-Action Revolver - .22 Jet)
 S&W Model 56	(US - Double-Action Revolver - .38 S&W Special)
 S&W Model 57	(US - Double-Action Revolver - .41 Remington Magnum)
 S&W Model 58	(US - Double-Action Revolver - .41 Remington Magnum)
 S&W Model 60	(US - Double-Action Revolver - .38 S&W Special)
 S&W Model 60-9	(US - Double-Action Revolver - .357 S&W Magnum)
 S&W Model 63	(US - Double-Action Revolver - .22 Long Rifle)
 S&W Model 64	(US - Double-Action Revolver - .38 S&W Special)
 S&W Model 65	(US - Double-Action Revolver - .357 S&W Magnum)
 S&W Model 66	(US - Double-Action Revolver - .357 S&W Magnum)
 S&W Model 67	(US - Double-Action Revolver - .38 S&W Special)
 S&W Model 68	(US - Double-Action Revolver - .38 S&W Special)
 S&W Model 73	(US - Double-Action Revolver - .38 S&W Special)
 S&W Model 242	(US - Double-Action Revolver - .38 S&W Special)
 S&W Model 296	(US - Double-Action Revolver - .44 S&W Special)
 S&W Model 317	(US - Double-Action Revolver - .22 Long Rifle)
 S&W Model 325	(US - Double-Action Revolver - .45 ACP)
 S&W Model 327	(US - Double-Action Revolver - .357 S&W Magnum)
 S&W Model 329	(US - Double-Action Revolver - .44 Remington Magnum)
 S&W Model 331	(US - Double-Action Revolver - .32 H&R Magnum)
 S&W Model 332	(US - Double-Action Revolver - .32 H&R Magnum)
 S&W Model 337	(US - Double-Action Revolver - .38 S&W Special)
 S&W Model 340	(US - Double-Action Revolver - .357 S&W Magnum)
 S&W Model 342	(US - Double-Action Revolver - .38 S&W Special)
 S&W Model 351	(US - Double-Action Revolver - .22 Winchester Magnum Rimfire)
 S&W Model 357	(US - Double-Action Revolver - .41 Remington Magnum)
 S&W Model 360	(US - Double-Action Revolver - .357 S&W Magnum)
 S&W Model 386	(US - Double-Action Revolver - .357 S&W Magnum)
 S&W Model 396	(US - Double-Action Revolver - .44 S&W Special)
 S&W Model 431	(US - Double-Action Revolver - .32 H&R Magnum)
 S&W Model 432	(US - Double-Action Revolver - .32 H&R Magnum)
 S&W Model 442	(US - Double-Action Revolver - .38 S&W Special)
 S&W Model 460XVR	(US - Double-Action Revolver - .460 S&W Magnum)
 S&W Model 500	(US - Double-Action Revolver - .500 S&W Magnum)
 S&W Model 520	(US - Double-Action Revolver - .357 S&W Magnum)
 S&W Model 520	(US - Double-Action Revolver - .357 S&W Magnum)
 S&W Model 544	(US - Double-Action Revolver - .44-40 Winchester)
 S&W Model 547	(US - Double-Action Revolver - 9×19mm Parabellum)
 S&W Model 581	(US - Double-Action Revolver - .357 S&W Magnum)
 S&W Model 586	(US - Double-Action Revolver - .357 S&W Magnum)
 S&W Model 610	(US - Double-Action Revolver - 10mm Auto)
 S&W Model 617	(US - Double-Action Revolver - .22 Long Rifle)
 S&W Model 619	(US - Double-Action Revolver - .357 S&W Magnum)
 S&W Model 620	(US - Double-Action Revolver - .357 S&W Magnum)
 S&W Model 624	(US - Double-Action Revolver - .44 S&W Special)
 S&W Model 625	(US - Double-Action Revolver - .45 ACP)
 S&W Model 625-2	(US - Double-Action Revolver - .45 ACP)
 S&W Model 625-3	(US - Double-Action Revolver - .45 ACP)
 S&W Model 625-8	(US - Double-Action Revolver - .45 ACP)
 S&W Model 625-10	(US - Double-Action Revolver - .45 ACP)
 S&W Model 625 Mountain Gun	(US - Double-Action Revolver - .45 ACP)
 S&W Model 627	(US - Double-Action Revolver - .357 S&W Magnum, .38 Super Automatic)
 S&W Model 629	(US - Double-Action Revolver - .44 Remington Magnum)
 S&W Model 631	(US - Double-Action Revolver - .32 H&R Magnum)
 S&W Model 632	(US - Double-Action Revolver - .32 H&R Magnum)
 S&W Model 637	(US - Double-Action Revolver - .38 S&W Special)
 S&W Model 637	(US - Double-Action Revolver - .38 S&W Special)
 S&W Model 640	(US - Double-Action Revolver - .38 S&W Special)
 S&W Model 640-1	(US - Double-Action Revolver - .357 S&W Magnum)
 S&W Model 642	(US - Double-Action Revolver - .38 S&W Special)
 S&W Model 646	(US - Double-Action Revolver - .40 S&W)
 S&W Model 647	(US - Double-Action Revolver - .17 Hornady Magnum Rimfire)
 S&W Model 648	(US - Double-Action Revolver - .22 Winchester Magnum Rimfire)
 S&W Model 649	(US - Double-Action Revolver - .38 S&W Special)
 S&W Model 649-3	(US - Double-Action Revolver - .357 S&W Magnum)
 S&W Model 650	(US - Double-Action Revolver - .22 Winchester Magnum Rimfire)
 S&W Model 651	(US - Double-Action Revolver - .22 Winchester Magnum Rimfire)
 S&W Model 657	(US - Double-Action Revolver - .41 Remington Magnum)
 S&W Model 681	(US - Double-Action Revolver - .357 S&W Magnum)
 S&W Model 686	(US - Double-Action Revolver - .357 S&W Magnum, .38 Super Automatic)
 S&W Model 686	(US - Double-Action Revolver - .357 S&W Magnum, .38 S&W Special)
 S&W Model 686P	(US - Double-Action Revolver - .357 S&W Magnum, .38 S&W Special P+)
 S&W Model 686PP	(US - Double-Action Revolver - .357 S&W Magnum, .38 S&W Special P++)
 S&W Model 696	(US - Double-Action Revolver - .44 S&W Special)
 S&W Model 940	(US - Double-Action Revolver - 9×19mm Parabellum)
 S&W Model 944	(US - Double-Action Revolver - 9×19mm Parabellum)
 S&W New Model 3	(US - Single-Action Revolver - .44 Henry, .44 S&W American)
 S&W New Model 3 Single Action	(US - Single-Action Revolver - .32 S&W Blackpowder, .32-44 S&W Special, .320 S&W Revolving Rifle, .38 S&W Blackpowder, .38 Colt, .38-40 Winchester, .38-44 S&W Special, .41 S&W, .44 Henry, .44 American, .44-40 Winchester, .45 Schofield, .450 Revolver, .45 Webley, .455 Mark I, .455 Mark II)
 S&W New Model 3 Target Model	(US - Single-Action Revolver - .32-44 S&W Special, .38-44 S&W Special)
 S&W New Model 3 Turkish	(US - Single-Action Revolver - .44 Henry)
 S&W New Model 3 Frontier	(US - Single-Action Revolver - .44-40 Winchester)
 S&W New Model 3 .38 Winchester	(US - Single-Action Revolver - .38-40 Winchester)
 Rifles
 Smith & Wesson Model 1500	(US - Bolt-Action Rifle - .30-06 Springfield)
 S&W Model 1940 Light Rifle	(US - Semi-Automatic Carbine - 9×19mm Parabellum)
 S&W M&P15	(US - Semi-Automatic Rifle - 5.56×45mm NATO, .223 Remington)
 S&W M&P15-22	(US - Semi-Automatic Rifle - .22 Long Rifle)
 S&W M&P15T	(US - Semi-Automatic Rifle - 5.56×45mm NATO, .223 Remington)
 Shotguns
 S&W AS	(US - Semi-Automatic Shotgun - 12 Gauge, 12 Gauge Fléchette)
 S&W AS-1	(US - Semi-Automatic Shotgun - 12 Gauge, 12 Gauge Fléchette)
 S&W AS-2	(US - Semi-Automatic Shotgun - 12 Gauge, 12 Gauge Fléchette)
 S&W AS-3	(US - Automatic Shotgun - 12 Gauge, 12 Gauge Fléchette)
 Submachine Guns
 S&W Model 76	(US - Submachine Gun - 9×19mm Parabellum: Carl Gustav m/45 Copy)
 Saab Bofors Dynamics
 Personal Defense Weapons
 CBJ-MS	(Kingdom of Sweden - Personal Defense Weapon - 6.5×25mm CBJ, 9×19mm Parabellum)
 Sabre Defense
 Rifles
 Sabre Defense A3-M4 Carbine	(US - Semi-Automatic Rifle - 6.5×39mm Grendel)
 SAKO
 Rifles
 Rk 95 Tp	(Republic of Finland - Assault Rifle - 7.62×39mm: Prototype)
 Sako M90	(Republic of Finland - Assault Rifle - 7.62×39mm: Prototype)
 M92S	(Republic of Finland - Assault Rifle - 7.62×39mm)
 M92S Export	(Republic of Finland - Assault Rifle - 5.56×45mm NATO)
 Sako M95	(Republic of Finland - Assault Rifle - 7.62×39mm)
 TRG	(Republic of Finland - Bolt-Action Sniper Rifle - Various)
 Sako TRG M10	(Republic of Finland - Bolt-Action Sniper Rifle - .300 Winchester Magnum, .308 Winchester, .338 Lapua Magnum)
 Sako TRG-21	(Republic of Finland - Bolt-Action Sniper Rifle - .308 Winchester)
 Sako TRG-22	(Republic of Finland - Bolt-Action Sniper Rifle - .260 Remington, .308 Winchester)
 Sako TRG-41	(Republic of Finland - Bolt-Action Sniper Rifle - .300 Winchester Magnum, .338 Lapua Magnum)
 Sako TRG-42	(Republic of Finland - Bolt-Action Sniper Rifle - .300 Winchester Magnum, .338 Lapua Magnum)
 Scandium Defence
 Scandium F12 (Turkey - Automatic Shotgun - 12 Gauge)
 Škoda Works
 Machine Guns
 Salvator-Dormus M1893	(Austria-Hungary - Heavy Machine Gun - 8×50mmR Mannlicher)
 Armeria San Cristóbal
 Rifles
 San Cristobal carbine	(Dominican Republic - Carbine - .30 Carbine)
 San Cristobal Model 3	(Dominican Republic - Battle Rifle - 7.62×51mm NATO)
 Sanna 77	(Republic of Rhodesia - Submachine Gun - 9×19mm Parabellum)
 Saritch 308	(Russian Federation - Semi-Automatic Designated Marksman Rifle - 7.62×51mm NATO: Prototype)
 Savage Arms
 Pistols
 Savage Arms M1907 Pistol	(US - Semi-Automatic Pistol - .32 ACP, .45 ACP, .380 ACP)
 Savage Arms M1915 Pistol	(US - Semi-Automatic Pistol - .32 ACP, .45 ACP, .380 ACP)
 Savage Arms M1917 Pistol	(US - Semi-Automatic Pistol - .32 ACP, .45 ACP, .380 ACP)
 Rifles
 Savage Arms 10FP Tactical	(US - Bolt-Action Rifle - .223 Remington)
 Savage Arms 110FP Tactical	(US - Bolt-Action Rifle - 7.62×51mm NATO, .30-06 Springfield, .308 Winchester)
 Savage Arms Model 12FVSS	(US - Semi-Automatic Pistol - .22-250 Remington)
 Savage Arms Model 93R17	(US - Bolt-Action Rifle - .17 Hornady Magnum Rimfire)
 Schmeisser International GmbH
 Pistols
 PH-45	(Germany, Ukraine - Semi-Automatic Pistol - .45 ACP)
 Schwarzlose MG M.07	(Austria-Hungary - Heavy Machine Gun - 8×50mmR Mannlicher M93, 8×56mmR M30S)
 Schwarzlose MG M.07/12	(Austria-Hungary - Heavy Machine Gun - 8×50mmR Mannlicher M93)
 Schwarzlose MG M.07/31	(Austria-Hungary - Heavy Machine Gun - 8×50mmR Mannlicher M93)
 Schwarzlose MG M.08	(Netherlands, Austria-Hungary - Heavy Machine Gun - 6.5×53mmR Mannlicher)
 Schwarzlose MG M.08/13	(Netherlands - Heavy Machine Gun - 6.5×53mmR Mannlicher)
 Schwarzlose MG M.08/15	(Netherlands - Heavy Machine Gun - 6.5×53mmR Mannlicher)
 Schwarzlose MG-16	(Austria-Hungary - Heavy Machine Gun - 8×50mmR Mannlicher M93)
 Schwarzlose MG-16A	(Austria-Hungary - Heavy Machine Gun - 8×50mmR Mannlicher M93)
 Schwarzlose-Janeček vz.07/12/24	(Austria-Hungary - Heavy Machine Gun - 7.92×57mm Mauser)
 Schwarzlose Model 1898	(German Empire - Semi-Automatic Pistol - 7.63×25mm Mauser, 7.65×25mm Borchardt)
 Schwarzlose Model 1908	(German Empire - Semi-Automatic Pistol - .32 ACP)
 SCK Kenju	(Japan - Submachine Gun - 9×19 Parabellum)
 SCK M-60	(Japan - Submachine Gun - 9×19 Parabellum)
 Sedgley OSS .38	(US - Assassination Device - .38 S&W Special)
 Seecamp	(US - Subcompact Semi-Automatic Pistol - .25 ACP, .32 ACP, .380 ACP)
 Semmerling
 Semmerling LM4   (US - pistol, manually operated - .45 ACP)
 Semmerling XLM   (US - Semi automatic pistol - .45 ACP)
 Seraphim Armoury
 Pistols
 SAI Model 1911 Archangel	(Canada - Semi-Automatic Pistol - .45 ACP, 9×19mm Parabellum)
 SAI Model 1911 Ghost	(Canada - Semi-Automatic Pistol - .45 ACP, 9×19mm Parabellum)
 SAI Model 1911 Warfighter	(Canada - Semi-Automatic Pistol - .45 ACP, 9×19mm Parabellum)
 SAI Model 1911 Guardian	(Canada - Semi-Automatic Pistol - .45 ACP, 9×19mm Parabellum)
 SAI Model 1911 Crusader (Canada - Semi-Automatic Pistol - .45 ACP, 9×19mm Parabellum)
 SAI Model 1911 GI	(Canada - Semi-Automatic Pistol - .45 ACP, 9×19mm Parabellum)
 Rifles
 Shotguns
 Serbu Firearms
 Pistols
 Serbu SIRIS (US - Integrally Suppressed Semi-Automatic Pistol - .22 Long Rifle: Licensed production Ruger MK II)
 Submachine guns
 Serbu ROF (US - Submachine gun - 9×19mm Parabellum)
 Rifles
 Serbu BFG-50	(US - Single-Shot Anti-Materiel Rifle - .50 BMG, .510 DTC EUROP)
 Serbu BFG-50A (US - Semi-Automatic Anti-Materiel Rifle - .50 BMG)
 Serbu SIRIS 1022 (US - Integrally Suppressed Semi-Automatic Rifle - .22 Long Rifle: Licensed production Ruger 10/22)
 Shotguns
 Serbu Super-Shorty	(US - Compact Pump-Action Shotgun - 12 Gauge, 20 Gauge)
 SG-43 Goryunov	(Soviet Union - Medium Machine Gun - 7.62×54mmR)
 SG-43M	(Soviet Union - Medium Machine Gun - 7.62×54mmR)
 SG-43MB	(Soviet Union - Medium Machine Gun - 7.62×54mmR)
 SG-43MT	(Soviet Union - Vehicle-Mounted Medium Machine Gun - 7.62×54mmR)
 Shaher AMR	(Islamic Republic of Iran - Bolt-Action Anti-Materiel Rifle - 14.5×114mm)
 Sharps Rifle	(US - Single-Shot Rifle - .45-70 Government)
 ShKAS Machine Gun	(Soviet Union - Aircraft-Mounted Heavy Machine Gun - 7.62×54mmR)
 ShKAS KM-33	(Soviet Union - Aircraft-Mounted Heavy Machine Gun - 7.62×54mmR)
 ShKAS KM-35	(Soviet Union - Aircraft-Mounted Heavy Machine Gun - 7.62×54mmR)
 ShKAS KM-36	(Soviet Union - Aircraft-Mounted Heavy Machine Gun - 7.62×54mmR)
 SIG Sauer
 Machine Guns
 SIG 710-3	(Swiss Confederation - General-Purpose Machine Gun - 7.62×51mm NATO)
 SIG 710-1	(Swiss Confederation - General-Purpose Machine Gun - 6.5×55mm Swedish)
 SIG 710-2	(Swiss Confederation - General-Purpose Machine Gun - 7.92×57mm Mauser)
 Pistols
 SIG P210	(Swiss Confederation - Semi-Automatic Pistol - 7.65×21mm Parabellum, 9×19mm Parabellum, .22 Long Rifle)
 SIG P210 Legend	(Swiss Confederation - Semi-Automatic Pistol - 7.65×21mm Parabellum, 9×19mm Parabellum)
 SIG P200	(Swiss Confederation - Double-Barreled Semi-Automatic Pistol - 7.65×21mm Parabellum, 9×19mm Parabellum: Prototype)
 SIG P210-1	(Swiss Confederation - Semi-Automatic Pistol - 7.65×21mm Parabellum, 9×19mm Parabellum)
 SIG M/49	(Swiss Confederation, Kingdom of Denmark - Semi-Automatic Pistol - 7.65×21mm Parabellum, 9×19mm Parabellum)
 SIG P210-2	(Swiss Confederation - Semi-Automatic Pistol - 9×19mm Parabellum)
 SIG M/49	(Swiss Confederation, Kingdom of Denmark - Semi-Automatic Pistol - 7.65×21mm Parabellum, 9×19mm Parabellum)
 SIG P210-4	(Swiss Confederation - Semi-Automatic Pistol - 9×19mm Parabellum)
 SIG P210-3	(Swiss Confederation - Semi-Automatic Pistol - 7.65×21mm Parabellum, 9×19mm Parabellum)
 SIG P210-5	(Swiss Confederation - Semi-Automatic Pistol - 7.65×21mm Parabellum, 9×19mm Parabellum)
 SIG P210-5LS	(Swiss Confederation - Semi-Automatic Pistol - 9×19mm Parabellum)
 SIG P210-6	(Swiss Confederation - Semi-Automatic Pistol - 7.65×21mm Parabellum, 9×19mm Parabellum)
 SIG P210-6S	(Swiss Confederation - Semi-Automatic Pistol - 9×19mm Parabellum)
 SIG P210-7	(Swiss Confederation - Semi-Automatic Pistol - .22 Long Rifle)
 SIG P210-8	(Swiss Confederation - Semi-Automatic Pistol - 9×19mm Parabellum)
 P220	(Federal Republic of Germany, Swiss Confederation - Semi-Automatic Pistol - 7.65×21mm Parabellum, 9×19mm Parabellum, 10mm Auto, .22 Long Rifle, .38 Super Automatic, .45 ACP)
 P220 Carry	(Federal Republic of Germany, Swiss Confederation - Compact Semi-Automatic Pistol - 7.65×21mm Parabellum, 9×19mm Parabellum, 10mm Auto, .22 Long Rifle, .38 Super Automatic, .45 ACP)
 P220 Carry DA/SA	(Federal Republic of Germany, Swiss Confederation - Semi-Automatic Pistol - .45 ACP)
 P220 Carry DAK	(Federal Republic of Germany, Swiss Confederation - Semi-Automatic Pistol - .45 ACP)
 P220 Carry SAO	(Federal Republic of Germany, Swiss Confederation - Semi-Automatic Pistol - .45 ACP)
 P220 Carry SAS	(Federal Republic of Germany, Swiss Confederation - Semi-Automatic Pistol - .45 ACP)
 P220 Classic 22	(Federal Republic of Germany, Swiss Confederation - Compact Semi-Automatic Pistol - .22 Long Rifle)
 P220 Combat	(Federal Republic of Germany, Swiss Confederation - Semi-Automatic Pistol - .45 ACP)
 P220 Combat TB	(Federal Republic of Germany, Swiss Confederation - Semi-Automatic Pistol - .45 ACP)
 P220 Compact	(Federal Republic of Germany, Swiss Confederation - Compact Semi-Automatic Pistol - .45 ACP)
 P220R	(Federal Republic of Germany, Swiss Confederation - Semi-Automatic Pistol - .45 ACP)
 P220ST	(Federal Republic of Germany, Swiss Confederation - Semi-Automatic Pistol - .45 ACP)
 P220ST Nitron	(Federal Republic of Germany, Swiss Confederation - Semi-Automatic Pistol - .45 ACP)
 P225/P6	(Federal Republic of Germany, Swiss Confederation - Compact Semi-Automatic Pistol - 9×19mm Parabellum)
 P245	(Federal Republic of Germany, Swiss Confederation - Compact Semi-Automatic Pistol - .45 ACP)
 P226	(Federal Republic of Germany, Swiss Confederation - Semi-Automatic Pistol - 9×19mm Parabellum, .40 S&W, .357 SIG)
 P226 Blackwater	(Federal Republic of Germany, Swiss Confederation - Compact Semi-Automatic Pistol - 9×19mm Parabellum)
 P226 Classic 22	(Federal Republic of Germany, Swiss Confederation - Semi-Automatic Pistol - .22 Long Rifle)
 P226 Combat	(Federal Republic of Germany, Swiss Confederation - Semi-Automatic Pistol - 9×19mm Parabellum, .40 S&W, .357 SIG)
 P226 Combat TB	(Federal Republic of Germany, Swiss Confederation - Semi-Automatic Pistol - 9×19mm Parabellum, .40 S&W, .357 SIG)
 P226 E2	(Federal Republic of Germany, Swiss Confederation - Compact Semi-Automatic Pistol - 9×19mm Parabellum, .40 S&W, .357 SIG)
 P226 Elite	(Federal Republic of Germany, Swiss Confederation - Compact Semi-Automatic Pistol - 9×19mm Parabellum, .40 S&W, .357 SIG)
 P226 Equinox	(Federal Republic of Germany, Swiss Confederation - Compact Semi-Automatic Pistol - .40 S&W)
 P226 LDC	(Federal Republic of Germany, Swiss Confederation - Compact Semi-Automatic Pistol - 9×19mm Parabellum, .40 S&W, .357 SIG)
 P226 Navy	(Federal Republic of Germany, Swiss Confederation - Compact Semi-Automatic Pistol - 9×19mm Parabellum, .40 S&W, .357 SIG)
 P226 SCT	(Federal Republic of Germany, Swiss Confederation - Compact Semi-Automatic Pistol - 9×19mm Parabellum, .40 S&W)
 P226 ST	(Federal Republic of Germany, Swiss Confederation - Compact Semi-Automatic Pistol - 9×19mm Parabellum, .40 S&W, .357 SIG)
 P226N	(Federal Republic of Germany, Swiss Confederation - Semi-Automatic Pistol - 9×19mm Parabellum, .40 S&W, .357 SIG)
 P226R	(Federal Republic of Germany, Swiss Confederation - Semi-Automatic Pistol - 9×19mm Parabellum, .40 S&W, .357 SIG)
 P226R HSP	(Federal Republic of Germany, Swiss Confederation - Semi-Automatic Pistol - .40 S&W)
 P228/M11	(Federal Republic of Germany, Swiss Confederation - Compact Semi-Automatic Pistol - 9×19mm Parabellum)
 M11A1	(Federal Republic of Germany, Swiss Confederation - Compact Semi-Automatic Pistol - 9×19mm Parabellum)
 M11B	(Federal Republic of Germany, Swiss Confederation - Compact Semi-Automatic Pistol - 9×19mm Parabellum)
 P229	(Federal Republic of Germany, Swiss Confederation - Compact Semi-Automatic Pistol - 9×19mm Parabellum, .40 S&W, .357 SIG)
 P224	(Federal Republic of Germany, Swiss Confederation - Subcompact Semi-Automatic Pistol - .40 S&W, .357 SIG)
 P224 DA/SA	(Federal Republic of Germany, Swiss Confederation - Subcompact Semi-Automatic Pistol - .40 S&W, .357 SIG)
 P224 Equinox	(Federal Republic of Germany, Swiss Confederation - Subcompact Semi-Automatic Pistol - .40 S&W, .357 SIG)
 P224 Extreme	(Federal Republic of Germany, Swiss Confederation - Subcompact Semi-Automatic Pistol - .40 S&W, .357 SIG)
 P224 Nickel	(Federal Republic of Germany, Swiss Confederation - Subcompact Semi-Automatic Pistol - .40 S&W, .357 SIG)
 P224 SAS	(Federal Republic of Germany, Swiss Confederation - Subcompact Semi-Automatic Pistol - .40 S&W, .357 SIG)
 P224 SRT DA/SA	(Federal Republic of Germany, Swiss Confederation - Subcompact Semi-Automatic Pistol - .40 S&W, .357 SIG)
 P229 Classic 22	(Federal Republic of Germany, Swiss Confederation - Compact Semi-Automatic Pistol - .22 Long Rifle)
 P229 Elite	(Federal Republic of Germany, Swiss Confederation - Compact Semi-Automatic Pistol - 9×19mm Parabellum, .40 S&W, .357 SIG)
 P229 Equinox	(Federal Republic of Germany, Swiss Confederation - Compact Semi-Automatic Pistol - 9×19mm Parabellum, .40 S&W, .357 SIG)
 P229 SAS	(Federal Republic of Germany, Swiss Confederation - Compact Semi-Automatic Pistol - 9×19mm Parabellum, .40 S&W, .357 SIG)
 P229 SAS GEN 2	(Federal Republic of Germany, Swiss Confederation - Compact Semi-Automatic Pistol - 9×19mm Parabellum, .40 S&W, .357 SIG)
 P229R	(Federal Republic of Germany, Swiss Confederation - Compact Semi-Automatic Pistol - 9×19mm Parabellum, .40 S&W, .357 SIG)
 P229R DAK	(Federal Republic of Germany, Swiss Confederation - Compact Semi-Automatic Pistol - 9×19mm Parabellum, .40 S&W, .357 SIG)
 P226 X-Series	(Federal Republic of Germany, Swiss Confederation - Semi-Automatic Pistol - 9×19mm Parabellum, .40 S&W, .357 SIG)
 P226 X-Five	(Federal Republic of Germany, Swiss Confederation - Semi-Automatic Pistol - 9×19mm Parabellum, .40 S&W, .357 SIG)
 P226 X-Five Allround	(Federal Republic of Germany, Swiss Confederation - Semi-Automatic Pistol - 9×19mm Parabellum, .40 S&W, .357 SIG)
 P226 X-Five Competition	(Federal Republic of Germany, Swiss Confederation - Semi-Automatic Pistol - 9×19mm Parabellum, .40 S&W, .357 SIG)
 P226 X-Five Level-1	(Federal Republic of Germany, Swiss Confederation - Semi-Automatic Pistol - 9×19mm Parabellum, .40 S&W, .357 SIG)
 P226 X-Five Lightweight	(Federal Republic of Germany, Swiss Confederation - Semi-Automatic Pistol - 9×19mm Parabellum, .40 S&W, .357 SIG)
 P226 X-Five Norway	(Federal Republic of Germany, Swiss Confederation - Semi-Automatic Pistol - 9×19mm Parabellum, .40 S&W, .357 SIG)
 P226 X-Five Tactical	(Federal Republic of Germany, Swiss Confederation - Semi-Automatic Pistol - 9×19mm Parabellum, .40 S&W, .357 SIG)
 P226 X-Short	(Federal Republic of Germany, Swiss Confederation - Semi-Automatic Pistol - 9×19mm Parabellum, .40 S&W, .357 SIG)
 P226 X-Six	(Federal Republic of Germany, Swiss Confederation - Semi-Automatic Pistol - 9×19mm Parabellum, .40 S&W, .357 SIG)
 P226 X-Six AL	(Federal Republic of Germany, Swiss Confederation - Semi-Automatic Pistol - 9×19mm Parabellum, .40 S&W, .357 SIG)
 P239	(Federal Republic of Germany, Swiss Confederation - Compact Semi-Automatic Pistol - 9×19mm Parabellum, .40 S&W, .357 SIG)
 P239 DA/SA	(Federal Republic of Germany, Swiss Confederation - Compact Semi-Automatic Pistol - 9×19mm Parabellum, .40 S&W, .357 SIG)
 P239 DAK	(Federal Republic of Germany, Swiss Confederation - Compact Semi-Automatic Pistol - 9×19mm Parabellum, .40 S&W, .357 SIG)
 P239 DAO	(Federal Republic of Germany, Swiss Confederation - Compact Semi-Automatic Pistol - 9×19mm Parabellum, .40 S&W, .357 SIG)
 P239 Tactical	(Federal Republic of Germany, Swiss Confederation - Compact Semi-Automatic Pistol - 9×19mm Parabellum, .40 S&W, .357 SIG)
 P239 SAS	(Federal Republic of Germany, Swiss Confederation - Compact Semi-Automatic Pistol - 9×19mm Parabellum, .40 S&W, .357 SIG)
 P239 SAS GEN 2	(Federal Republic of Germany, Swiss Confederation - Compact Semi-Automatic Pistol - 9×19mm Parabellum, .40 S&W, .357 SIG)
 P239G	(Federal Republic of Germany, Swiss Confederation - Compact Semi-Automatic Pistol - 9×19mm Parabellum, .40 S&W, .357 SIG)
 P230	(Federal Republic of Germany, Swiss Confederation - Compact Semi-Automatic Pistol - 9×18mm Ultra, .32 ACP, .380 ACP)
 P230-JP	(Federal Republic of Germany, Swiss Confederation - Compact Semi-Automatic Pistol - 9×18mm Ultra, .32 ACP, .380 ACP)
 P232	(Federal Republic of Germany, Swiss Confederation - Compact Semi-Automatic Pistol - 9×18mm Ultra, .32 ACP, .380 ACP)
 SIG Pro	(Swiss Confederation - Semi-Automatic Pistol - 9×19mm Parabellum)
 SP 2009	(Swiss Confederation - Semi-Automatic Pistol - 9×19mm Parabellum)
 SP 2009-9-BMS	(Swiss Confederation - Semi-Automatic Pistol - 9×19mm Parabellum)
 SP 2022	(Swiss Confederation - Semi-Automatic Pistol - 9×19mm Parabellum & .40 S&W: Picatinny Rail)
 SPC 2022	(Swiss Confederation - Semi-Automatic Pistol - 9×19mm Parabellum & .40 S&W: Picatinny Rail)
 SP 2340 (Swiss Confederation - Semi-Automatic Pistol - .357 SIG & .40 S&W)
 Rifles
 SIG SG 510	(Swiss Confederation - Battle Rifle - 7.62×51mm NATO)
 SIG SG510-1	(Swiss Confederation - Battle Rifle - 7.62×51mm NATO)
 SIG SG510-2	(Swiss Confederation - Battle Rifle - 7.62×55mm Swiss GP 11)
 SIG SG510-3	(Swiss Confederation - Assault Rifle - 7.62×39mm)
 SIG SG510-4	(Swiss Confederation - Battle Rifle - 7.62×51mm NATO)
 SIG AMT	(Swiss Confederation - Semi-Automatic Rifle - 7.62×55mm Swiss GP 11, .308 Winchester)
 SIG PE 57	(Swiss Confederation - Semi-Automatic Rifle - 7.62×55mm Swiss GP 11)
 SIG SG 530	(Swiss Confederation - Assault Rifle - 5.56×45mm NATO)
 SIG SG 540	(Swiss Confederation - Assault Rifle - 5.56×45mm NATO)
 SG SG 541	(Swiss Confederation - Assault Rifle - 5.56×45mm NATO: Prototype)
 SIG SG 542	(Swiss Confederation - Battle Rifle - 7.62×51mm NATO)
 SIG SG 543	(Swiss Confederation - Carbine - 5.56×45mm NATO)
 SIG SG 550	(Swiss Confederation - Semi Auto Rifle -  5.56×45mm NATO)
 SIG PE 90	(Swiss Confederation, Canada - Semi-Automatic Rifle -  5.56×45mm NATO)
 SIG SG 550 Sniper	(Swiss Confederation - Semi-Automatic Designated Marksman Rifle -  5.56×45mm NATO)
 SIG SG 550 SP	(Swiss Confederation - Semi-Automatic Rifle -  5.56×45mm NATO)
 SIG SG 551	(Swiss Confederation - Carbine - 5.56×45mm NATO)
 SIG SG 551 LB	(Swiss Confederation - Carbine - 5.56×45mm NATO)
 SIG SG 551 SP	(Swiss Confederation - Semi-Automatic Carbine - 5.56×45mm NATO)
 SIG SG 551 SWAT	(Swiss Confederation - Carbine - 5.56×45mm NATO)
 SIG SG 551-1P	(Swiss Confederation - Carbine - 5.56×45mm NATO)
 SIG SG 552 Commando	(Swiss Confederation - Compact Assault Rifle - 5.56×45mm NATO)
 SIG SG 552 LB	(Swiss Confederation - Compact Assault Rifle - 5.56×45mm NATO)
 SIG SG 552 SP	(Swiss Confederation - Compact Semi-Automatic Rifle - 5.56×45mm NATO)
 SIG SG 553	(Swiss Confederation - Compact Assault Rifle - 5.56×45mm NATO)
 SIG SG 553 LB	(Swiss Confederation - Compact Assault Rifle - 5.56×45mm NATO)
 SIG SG 553 R	(Swiss Confederation - Compact Assault Rifle - 7.62×39mm)
 SIG SG 553 SB	(Swiss Confederation - Compact Assault Rifle - 5.56×45mm NATO)
 SIG SG 553 SOW	(Swiss Confederation - Compact Assault Rifle - 5.56×45mm NATO)
 SIG 522	(Federal Republic of Germany, Swiss Confederation - Semi-Automatic Rifle -  .22 Long Rifle)
 SIG 522 Classic	(Federal Republic of Germany - Semi-Automatic Rifle -  .22 Long Rifle)
 SIG 522 Commando	(Federal Republic of Germany - Semi-Automatic Carbine -  .22 Long Rifle)
 SIG 522 SWAT	(Federal Republic of Germany - Semi-Automatic Rifle -  .22 Long Rifle)
 SIG 522 SWAT Commando	(Federal Republic of Germany - Semi-Automatic Carbine -  .22 Long Rifle)
 SIG 522 Target	(Federal Republic of Germany - Semi-Automatic Rifle -  .22 Long Rifle)
 SIG556	(Swiss Confederation - Semi-Automatic Rifle -  5.56×45mm NATO)
 SIG556 Classic	(Swiss Confederation - Semi-Automatic Rifle -  5.56×45mm NATO)
 SIG556 DMR	(Swiss Confederation - Semi-Automatic Designated Marksman Rifle -  5.56×45mm NATO)
 SIG556 SWAT	(Swiss Confederation - Semi-Automatic Rifle -  5.56×45mm NATO)
 SIG556R	(Swiss Confederation - Semi-Automatic Rifle -  7.62×39mm)
 SIGP556	(Swiss Confederation - Subcompact Semi-Automatic Rifle -  5.56×45mm NATO)
 SIG Sport	(Swiss Confederation - Semi-Automatic Rifle -  5.56×45mm NATO)
 SSG 2000	(Federal Republic of Germany, Swiss Confederation - Bolt-Action Sniper Rifle - 7.62×51mm NATO)
 SSG 3000	(Federal Republic of Germany, Swiss Confederation - Bolt-Action Sniper Rifle - 7.62×51mm NATO)
 Submachine Guns
 SIG MP310	(Swiss Confederation - Submachine Gun - 9×19mm Parabellum)
 SIG MPX	(Swiss Confederation - Submachine Gun - 9×19mm Parabellum)
 Silin gun	(Soviet Union - Medium Machine Gun - 7.62×54mmR)
 Sima Electronica
 Rifles
 FAD Assault Rifle	(Republic of Peru - Assault Rifle with Grenade Launcher - 5.56×45mm NATO, 40×46mm SR Grenade: In Development)
 FAD Carbine	(Republic of Peru - Carbine with Grenade Launcher - 5.56×45mm NATO, 40×46mm SR Grenade)
 FAD Light Machine Gun	(Republic of Peru - Squad Automatic Weapon with Grenade Launcher - 5.56×45mm NATO, 40×46mm SR Grenade)
 FAD Sniper	(Republic of Peru - Designated Marksman Rifle with Grenade Launcher - 5.56×45mm NATO, 40×46mm SR Grenade)
 Submachine Guns
 SIMA-CEFAR MGP-15	(Republic of Peru - Submachine Gun - 9×19mm Parabellum)
 SIMA-CEFAR MGP-14	(Republic of Peru - Semi-Automatic Carbine - 9×19mm Parabellum)
 SIMA-CEFAR MGP-84	(Republic of Peru - Submachine Gun - 9×19mm Parabellum)
 SIMA-CEFAR MGP-79	(Republic of Peru - Submachine Gun - 9×19mm Parabellum)
 SIMA-CEFAR MGP-79 A	(Republic of Peru - Submachine Gun - 9×19mm Parabellum)
 SIMA-CEFAR MGP-87	(Republic of Peru - Submachine Gun - 9×19mm Parabellum)
 Sjögren shotgun	(Kingdom of Denmark - Semi-Automatic Shotgun - 12 Gauge)
 Škoda Works
 Machine Guns
 Skoda M1893	(Austria-Hungary - Heavy Machine Gun - 8×50mmR Mannlicher)
 Skoda M1909	(Austria-Hungary - Medium Machine Gun - 8×50mmR Mannlicher)
 SLEM-1	(United Kingdom - Semi-Automatic Rifle - 7.92×57mm Mauser)
 Slostin Machine Gun	(Soviet Union - Gatling-Type Heavy Machine Gun - 7.62×54mmR, 14.5×114mm: Prototype)
 SLR-15	(US - Semi-Automatic Rifle - 5.56×45mm NATO)
 SKS	(Soviet Union - Semi-Automatic Carbine - 7.62×39mm)
 SKS Honor Guard	(Soviet Union - Semi-Automatic Carbine - 7.62×39mm)
 OP-SKS	(Soviet Union - Semi-Automatic Carbine - 7.62×39mm)
 SM-9	(Republic of Guatemala - Machine Pistol - 9×19mm Parabellum)
 Smith Carbine	(US - Breech-Loading Carbine - .50 Smith)
 Savin Narov Machine Gun	(Soviet Union - Medium Machine Gun - 7.62×54mmR)
 Società Italiana Tecnologie Speciali S.p.A. 
 Pistols
 Resolver Pistol	(Italian Republic - Compact Semi-Automatic Pistol)
 Resolver M9	(Italian Republic - Compact Semi-Automatic Pistol - 9×19mm Parabellum)
 Resolver M380	(Italian Republic - Compact Semi-Automatic Pistol - .380 ACP)
 Submachine Guns
 Spectre M4	(Italian Republic - Submachine Gun - 9×19mm Parabellum)
 Società Costruzioni Industriali Milano
 Rifles
 SOCIMI AR-831	(Italian Republic - Assault Rifle - 5.56×45mm NATO)
 SOCIMI AR-832/FS	(Italian Republic - Assault Rifle - 5.56×45mm NATO)
 SOCIMI AR-871	(Italian Republic - Assault Rifle - 5.56×45mm NATO)
 Submachine Guns
 SOCIMI SMG 821	(Italian Republic - Submachine Gun - 9×19mm Parabellum)
 Sokolovsky Automaster	(US - Semi-Automatic Pistol - .45 ACP)
 Solothurn
 Pistols
 AT84-S	(Swiss Confederation - Semi-Automatic Pistol - 9×19mm Parabellum: CZ-75 Clone)
 Rifles
 Solothurn S-18/100	(Nazi Germany, Swiss Confederation - Semi-Automatic Anti-Materiel Rifle - 20×105mmB)
 Solothurn S-18/1000	(Nazi Germany, Swiss Confederation - Semi-Automatic Anti-Materiel Rifle - 20×138mmB)
 Solothurn S-18/1100	(Nazi Germany, Swiss Confederation - Automatic Anti-Materiel Rifle - 20×138mmB)
 Spasov M1936 (Bulgaria - Light Machine Gun - 7.62×54mmR / 7.92×57mm)
 Spasov M1939 (Bulgaria - Submachine Gun - 9×19mm Parabellum)
 Spasov M1944 (Bulgaria - Submachine Gun - 9×19mm Parabellum)
 Spasov M1944 Trigun (Bulgaria - Submachine Gun - 9×19mm Parabellum)
 SPHINX S2000	(Swiss Confederation - Semi-Automatic Pistol - 9×19mm Parabellum)
 SPHINX S3000	(Swiss Confederation - Semi-Automatic Pistol - 9×19mm Parabellum)
 SPP-1 Underwater Pistol	(Soviet Union - Semi-Automatic Underwater Pistol - 4.5×40mmR)
 Springfield Armory (US Military provider 1777–1968)
 Launchers
 M75	(US - Automatic Grenade Launcher - 40×53mm Grenade)
 M129	(US - Automatic Grenade Launcher - 40×46mm SR Grenade, 40×53mm Grenade)
 M79	(US - Single-Shot Grenade Launcher - 40×46mm SR Grenade)
 Springfield M1911A1	(US - Semi-Automatic Pistol - 9×19mm Parabellum, .45 ACP)
 Rifles
 Springfield Model 1866	(US - Single-Shot Breech-Loading Rifle - .50-70 Government)
 Springfield Model 1873	(US - Single-Shot Breech-Loading Rifle - .45-70 Government)
 Springfield Model 1879	(US - Single-Shot Breech-Loading Rifle - .45-70 Government)
 Springfield Model 1879 Carbine	(US - Single-Shot Breech-Loading Carbine - .45-70 Government)
 Springfield Model 1880	(US - Single-Shot Rifle Breech-Loading - .45-70 Government)
 Springfield Model 1884	(US - Single-Shot Rifle Breech-Loading - .45-70 Government)
 Springfield Model 1884 Carbine	(US - Single-Shot Breech-Loading Carbine - .45-70 Government)
 Springfield Model 1888	(US - Single-Shot Breech-Loading Rifle - .45-70 Government)
 Springfield Model 1889	(US - Single-Shot Breech-Loading Rifle - .45-70 Government)
 Springfield Model 1903	(US - Bolt-Action Rifle - .30-06 Springfield)
 Springfield Model 1903 Air Service	(US - Bolt-Action Rifle - .30-06 Springfield)
 Springfield Model 1903 Bullpup	(US - Bolt-Action Rifle - .30-06 Springfield: Prototype)
 Springfield Model 1903 Bushmaster Carbine	(US - Bolt-Action Carbine - .30-06 Springfield)
 Springfield Model 1903 Mark I	(US - Bolt-Action Rifle - .30-06 Springfield)
 Springfield Model 1903 NM	(US - Bolt-Action Rifle - .30-06 Springfield)
 Springfield Model 1903 NRA	(US - Bolt-Action Rifle - .30-06 Springfield)
 Springfield Model 1903 Scant Stock	(US - Bolt-Action Rifle - .30-06 Springfield)
 Springfield Model 1903A1	(US - Bolt-Action Rifle - .30-06 Springfield)
 Springfield Model 1903A2	(US - Bolt-Action Sub-Caliber Training Rifle - .30-06 Springfield)
 Springfield Model 1903A3	(US - Bolt-Action Rifle - .30-06 Springfield)
 Springfield Model 1903A4	(US - Bolt-Action Sniper Rifle - .30-06 Springfield)
 Springfield SALVO	(US - Assault Rifle - 5.56×45mm NATO)
 Springfield SAR 48	(Federative Republic of Brazil, US - Semi-Automatic Rifle - 7.62×51mm NATO)
 Springfield SAR-48HB	(Federative Republic of Brazil, US - Semi-Automatic Rifle - 7.62×51mm NATO)
 Springfield SAR4800	(Federative Republic of Brazil, US - Semi-Automatic Rifle - 7.62×51mm NATO)
 Springfield SAR-8	(Hellenic Republic, US - Semi-Automatic Rifle - 7.62×51mm NATO)
 Springfield SAR-8 HBCS	(Hellenic Republic, US - Semi-Automatic Rifle - 7.62×51mm NATO)
 Springfield SPIW	(US - Assault Rifle with Grenade Launcher - 5.56×45mm SCF Fléchette, 40×46mm SR Grenade: Prototype)
 Springfield UMG       (US - Machine Gun - 5.56×45mm SCF Fléchette)
 Springfield Armory, Inc. (contemporary importer and manufacturer)
 Pistols
 Springfield Armory 911      (US – Subcompact Semi-Automatic Pistol – .380 ACP, 9×19mm Parabellum)
 Springfield Armory EMP      (US – Subcompact Semi-Automatic Pistol – 9×19mm Parabellum, .40 S&W)
 Springfield Armory Hellcat  (Croatia – Micro-compact Semi-Automatic Pistol – 9×19mm Parabellum)
 Springfield Armory XD       (Croatia – Semi-Automatic Pistol series – multiple calibers)
 includes XD-M, XD-S, XD-E variants
 Rifles
 Springfield Armory BM59	(US - Semi-Automatic Rifle - 7.62×51mm NATO)
 Springfield Armory M1A      (US – Semi-Automatic Rifle – 7.62×51mm NATO, .308 Winchester, 6.5mm Creedmoor)
 Springfield Armory M6 Scout (US – combination gun – .22 Hornet over .410 bore)
 Springfield Armory SAINT    (US – Semi-Automatic Rifle – 5.56×45mm NATO, .308 Winchester, .300 AAC Blackout)
 SRM Arms
 Shotguns
 SRM Arms Model 1216	(US - Semi-Automatic Shotgun - 12 Gauge)
 SRM Arms Model 1208	(US - Shortened Semi-Automatic Shotgun - 12 Gauge)
 SRM Arms Model 1212	(US - Compact Semi-Automatic Shotgun - 12 Gauge)
 Star Bonifacio Echeverria, S.A
 Pistols
 JO.LO.AR.	(Kingdom of Spain - Semi-Automatic Pistol - 9×23mm Largo, .25 ACP, .32 ACP, .45 ACP, .380 ACP)
 Star M30	(Kingdom of Spain - Semi-Automatic Pistol - 9×19mm Parabellum)
 Star M31	(Kingdom of Spain - Semi-Automatic Pistol - 9×19mm Parabellum)
 Star Megastar	(Kingdom of Spain - Semi-Automatic Pistol - 10mm Auto, .45 ACP)
 Star Military Model 1	(Kingdom of Spain - Semi-Automatic Pistol - 9×19mm Parabellum)
 Star Model 1920 Military	(Kingdom of Spain - Semi-Automatic Pistol - 9×23mm Largo)
 Star Model 1922	(Kingdom of Spain - Semi-Automatic Pistol - 9×23mm Largo)
 Star Model A	(Kingdom of Spain - Semi-Automatic Pistol - 9×23mm Largo)
 Star Model B	(Kingdom of Spain - Semi-Automatic Pistol - 9×19mm Parabellum)
 Star Model B Super	(Kingdom of Spain - Semi-Automatic Pistol - 9×19mm Parabellum)
 Star Model BM	(Nationalist Spain - Semi-Automatic Pistol - 9×19mm Parabellum)
 Star Model BKM	(Nationalist Spain - Semi-Automatic Pistol - 9×19mm Parabellum)
 Star Model BKS	(Nationalist Spain - Semi-Automatic Pistol - 9×19mm Parabellum)
 Star Model M	(Kingdom of Spain - Semi-Automatic Pistol - 9×23mm Largo)
 Star Model MD	(Kingdom of Spain - Semi-Automatic Pistol - 9×23mm Largo)
 Star Model DKL	(Kingdom of Spain - Compact Semi-Automatic Pistol - 9×23mm Largo)
 Star Model F	(Kingdom of Spain - Semi-Automatic Pistol - .22 Long Rifle)
 Star Model PD	(Kingdom of Spain - Compact Semi-Automatic Pistol - .45 ACP)
 Star Model S	(Kingdom of Spain - Semi-Automatic Pistol - .380 ACP)
 Star Model Z84		(Kingdom of Spain - 1985 - Machine Pistol - 9×19mm Parabellum: Machine Pistol used by the UEBC combat diver group of the Royal Spanish Navy.)
 Star Starlite	(Kingdom of Spain - Subcompact Semi-Automatic Pistol - .25 ACP)
 Star Ultrastar	(Kingdom of Spain - Compact Semi-Automatic Pistol - 9×19mm Parabellum)
 Submachine Guns
 Star Si35	(Second Spanish Republic - Submachine Gun - 9×23mm Largo)
 Star Model Z62	(Nationalist Spain - Submachine Gun - 9×19mm Parabellum)
 Starr Arms Company
 Revolvers
 Starr DA	(US - Double-Action Revolver - .44 Percussion)
 Starr DA Navy	(US - Double-Action Revolver - .36 Percussion)
 Stemple 76/45	(US - Submachine Gun - .45 ACP: S&W Model 76 Clone)
 Sterling Armaments Company
 Rifles
 Sterling SAR-87	(UK - Assault Rifle - 5.56×45mm NATO)
 Submachine Guns
 Lanchester Mk 1	(UK - Submachine Gun - 9×19mm Parabellum)
 Sterling Revolver	(UK - Double-Action Revolver - .357 Magnum)
 Sterling Submachine Gun	(UK - Submachine Gun - 9×19mm Parabellum)
 Sterling MK7A4 Paratroopers Pistol	(UK - Semi-Automatic Pistol - 9×19mm Parabellum)
 Sterling 7.62	(UK - Squad Automatic Weapon - 7.62×51mm NATO)
 Steyr Mannlicher
 Pistols
 Steyr GB	(Republic of Austria - Semi-Automatic Pistol - 9×19mm Parabellum)
 Steyr M Series	(Republic of Austria - Semi-Automatic Pistols)
 Steyr M-A1 Series	(Republic of Austria - Semi-Automatic Pistols)
 Steyr M9-A1	(Republic of Austria - Semi-Automatic Pistol - 9×19mm Parabellum, 9×21mm IMI)
 Steyr M40-A1	(Republic of Austria - Semi-Automatic Pistol - .40 S&W)
 Steyr M357-A1	(Republic of Austria - Semi-Automatic Pistol - .357 SIG)
 Steyr M9	(Republic of Austria - Semi-Automatic Pistol - 9×19mm Parabellum, 9×21mm IMI)
 Steyr M40	(Republic of Austria - Semi-Automatic Pistol - .40 S&W)
 Steyr M357	(Republic of Austria - Semi-Automatic Pistol - .357 SIG)
 Steyr S Series	(Republic of Austria - Subcompact Semi-Automatic Pistols)
 Steyr S9	(Republic of Austria - Subcompact Semi-Automatic Pistol - 9×19mm Parabellum, 9×21mm IMI)
 Steyr S40	(Republic of Austria - Subcompact Semi-Automatic Pistol - .40 S&W)
 Steyr S-A1 Series	(Republic of Austria - Subcompact Semi-Automatic Pistols)
 Steyr S9-A1	(Republic of Austria - Subcompact Semi-Automatic Pistol - 9×19mm Parabellum, 9×21mm IMI)
 Steyr S40-A1	(Republic of Austria - Subcompact Semi-Automatic Pistol - .40 S&W)
 Steyr Mannlicher M1894	(Austria-Hungary - Semi-Automatic Pistol - 7.65×21mm Mannlicher)
 Steyr Mannlicher M1901	(Austria-Hungary - Semi-Automatic Pistol - 7.65×21mm Mannlicher)
 Rifles
 AUG	(Republic of Austria - Assault Rifle - 5.56×45mm NATO)
 AUG A0	(Republic of Austria  - Assault Rifle - 5.56×45mm NATO)
 AUG A1	(Republic of Austria  - Assault Rifle - 5.56×45mm NATO)
 AUG P	(Republic of Austria  - Semi-Automatic Carbine - 5.56×45mm NATO)
 AUG P Special Receiver	(Republic of Austria  - Semi-Automatic Carbine - 5.56×45mm NATO)
 AUG SA	(Republic of Austria  - Semi-Automatic Rifle - 5.56×45mm NATO)
 AUG A2	(Republic of Austria  - Assault Rifle - 5.56×45mm NATO)
 AUG A3 SF	(Republic of Austria  - Assault Rifle - 5.56×45mm NATO)
 AUG USR	(Republic of Austria  - Semi-Automatic Rifle - 5.56×45mm NATO)
 AUG A3	(Republic of Austria  - Assault Rifle - 5.56×45mm NATO)
 AUG A3 Para	(Republic of Austria  - Submachine Gun - 9×19mm Parabellum)
 AUG A3 M1	(Republic of Austria  - Semi-Automatic Carbine - 5.56×45mm NATO)
 AUG A3 SA NATO	(Republic of Austria  - Semi-Automatic Carbine - 5.56×45mm NATO)
 AUG A3 SA USA	(Republic of Austria  - Semi-Automatic Carbine - 5.56×45mm NATO)
 Steyr AUG HBAR	(Republic of Austria - Squad Automatic Weapon - 5.56×45mm NATO)
 AUG HBAR-T	(Republic of Austria  - Designated Marksman Rifle/Squad Automatic Weapon - 5.56×45mm NATO)
 AUG LMG	(Republic of Austria  - Assault Rifle - 5.56×45mm NATO)
 AUG LMG-T	(Republic of Austria  - Assault Rifle - 5.56×45mm NATO)
 AUG LSW	(Republic of Austria  - Squad Automatic Weapon - 5.56×45mm NATO)
 AUG M203	(Republic of Austria  - Assault Rifle with Grenade Launcher - 5.56×45mm NATO)
 AUG Para	(Republic of Austria  - Submachine Gun - 9×19mm Parabellum)
 AUG Z	(Republic of Austria  - Semi-Automatic Rifle - 5.56×45mm NATO)
 IWS 2000	(Republic of Austria - Semi-Automatic Anti-Materiel Rifle - 15.2×169mm)
 AMR 5075	(Republic of Austria - Semi-Automatic Anti-Materiel Rifle - 14.5×114mm)
 Mannlicher M1886	(Austria-Hungary - Bolt-Action Rifle - 11×58mmR)
 Mannlicher M1886 Carbine	(Austria-Hungary - Bolt-Action Carbine - 11×58mmR)
 Mannlicher M1886-88	(Austria-Hungary - Bolt-Action Rifle - 8×52mmR)
 Mannlicher M1888	(Austria-Hungary - Bolt-Action Rifle - 8×50mmR Mannlciher, 8×56mmR)
 Mannlicher M1888/24	(Austria-Hungary - Bolt-Action Rifle - 8×57mm IS)
 Mannlicher M1888/90	(Austria-Hungary - Bolt-Action Rifle - 8×52mmR)
 Mannlicher M1888/95	(Austria-Hungary - Bolt-Action Rifle - 8×50mmR Mannlicher)
 Mannlicher M1890	(Austria-Hungary - Straight-Pull Bolt-Action Rifle - 8×50mmR Mannlicher, 8×52mmR)
 Mannlicher M1890/24	(Austria-Hungary - Straight-Pull Bolt-Action Carbine - 8×57mm IS)
 Mannlicher M1890/30	(Austria-Hungary - Straight-Pull Bolt-Action Carbine - 8×56mmR)
 Mannlicher M1890 Cavalry Carbine	(Austria-Hungary - Straight-Pull Bolt-Action Carbine - 8×50mmR Mannlicher, 8×52mmR)
 Mannlicher M1890 Gendarmerie Carbine	(Austria-Hungary - Straight-Pull Bolt-Action Carbine - 8×50mmR Mannlicher, 8×52mmR)
 Mannlicher M1890 Navy Short Rifle	(Austria-Hungary - Straight-Pull Bolt-Action Carbine - 8×50mmR Mannlicher, 8×52mmR)
 Mannlicher M1895	(Austria-Hungary - Bolt-Action Rifle - 8×52mmR)
 Mannlicher M1895 Carbine	(Austria-Hungary - Bolt-Action Carbine - 8×50mmR Mannlicher)
 Mannlicher M1895 Infantry Rifle	(Austria-Hungary - Bolt-Action Rifle - 8×50mmR Mannlicher)
 Mannlicher M1895 Short Rifle	(Austria-Hungary - Bolt-Action Carbine - 8×50mmR Mannlicher)
 Mannlicher M1895/24	(Austria-Hungary - Bolt-Action Rifle - 8×57mm IS)
 Mannlicher M1895/30	(Austria-Hungary - Bolt-Action Rifle - 8×56mmR)
 Mannlicher M1895/31	(Austria-Hungary - Bolt-Action Rifle - 8×56mmR)
 Mannlicher M1895M	(Austria-Hungary - Bolt-Action Rifle - 8×57mm IS)
 Mannlicher–Schönauer	(Austria-Hungary - Bolt-Action Rifle - 6.5×54mm Mannlicher–Schönauer)
 Mannlicher–Schönauer M1903/14	(Austria-Hungary - Bolt-Action Rifle - 6.5×54mm Mannlicher–Schönauer)
 Mannlicher–Schönauer M1903/14/30	(Austria-Hungary - Bolt-Action Carbine - 6.5×54mm Mannlicher–Schönauer)
 Mannlicher–Schönauer M1905	(Austria-Hungary - Bolt-Action Rifle - 9×56mm Mannlicher–Schönauer)
 Mannlicher–Schönauer M1908	(Austria-Hungary - Bolt-Action Rifle - 8×56mm Mannlicher–Schönauer)
 Mannlicher–Schönauer M1910	(Austria-Hungary - Bolt-Action Rifle - 9×57mm Mannlicher–Schönauer)
 Mannlicher–Schönauer Model 72	(Austria-Hungary - Bolt-Action Rifle - .243 Winchester, .270 Winchester, .30-06 Springfield)
 Steyr ACR	(Republic of Austria - Assault Rifle - 5.56×45mm SCF Fléchette: Prototype)
 SSG-69	(Republic of Austria - Bolt-Action Sniper Rifle - 7.62×51mm NATO, .243 Winchester)
 SSG-69 PI	(Republic of Austria - Bolt-Action Sniper Rifle - 7.62×51mm NATO, .243 Winchester)
 SSG-69 PII	(Republic of Austria - Bolt-Action Sniper Rifle - 7.62×51mm NATO, .22-250 Remington, .243 Winchester)
 SSG-69 PIIK	(Republic of Austria - Bolt-Action Sniper Rifle - 7.62×51mm NATO, .22-250 Remington, .243 Winchester)
 SSG-69 PIV	(Republic of Austria - Bolt-Action Sniper Rifle - 7.62×51mm NATO, .243 Winchester)
 Steyr Scout	(Republic of Austria - Bolt Action Rifle - 5.56×45mm NATO, 7mm-08 Remington, 7.62×51mm NATO, .223 Remington, .243 Winchester, .308 Winchester, .376 Steyr)
 Scout Elite	(Republic of Austria - Bolt Action Rifle - 5.56×45mm NATO, 7mm-08 Remington, 7.62×51mm NATO)
 Submachine Guns
 Steyr MPi 69	(Republic of Austria - Submachine Gun - 9×19mm Parabellum)
 Steyr MPi 81	(Republic of Austria - Submachine Gun - 9×19mm Parabellum)
 Steyr TMP	(Republic of Austria - Submachine Gun - 9×19mm Parabellum)
 Steyr SPP	(Republic of Austria - Semi-Automatic Pistol - 9×19mm Parabellum)
 Roth–Steyr M1907	(Austria-Hungary - Semi-Automatic Pistol - 8mm Roth–Steyr)
 Steyr-Mannlicher Precision Rifle SR100	(Republic of Austria - Bolt-Action Sniper Rifle - 7.62×51mm NATO, .300 Winchester Magnum, .308 Winchester, .338 Lapua Magnum)
 Steyr-Solothurn S1-100	(First Republic of Austria - Submachine Gun - 9×19mm Parabellum: MP 34 Variant)
 StG 44	(Nazi Germany - Assault Rifle - 7.92×33mm Kurz)
 Pistols
 STI Eagle	(US - Semi-Automatic Pistol - 9×19mm, .40 S&W, .45 ACP)
 ST Kinetics
 Chartered Industries Singapore
 Launchers
 ST Kinetics 40 GL	(Republic of Singapore - Underslung Single-Shot Grenade Launcher  - 40×46mm Grenade)
 Machine Guns
 CIS 50MG	(Republic of Singapore - Heavy Machine Gun - .50 BMG)
 Ultimax 100	(Republic of Singapore - Squad Automatic Weapon - 5.56×45mm NATO)
 Ultimax Mark 1	(Republic of Singapore - Squad Automatic Weapon - 5.56×45mm NATO)
 Ultimax Mark 2	(Republic of Singapore - Squad Automatic Weapon - 5.56×45mm NATO)
 Ultimax Mark 3/3A	(Republic of Singapore - Squad Automatic Weapon - 5.56×45mm NATO)
 Ultimax Mark 4	(Republic of Singapore - Squad Automatic Weapon - 5.56×45mm NATO)
 Ultimax Mark 5	(Republic of Singapore - Squad Automatic Weapon - 5.56×45mm NATO)
 Personal Defense Weapons
 CPW	(Republic of Singapore - Personal Defense Weapon - HK 4.6×30mm, FN 5.7×28mm, 9×19mm Parabellum)
 ST Kinetics SSW	(Republic of Singapore - Semi-Automatic Personal Defense Weapon with Automatic Grenade Launcher - HK 4.6×30mm, FN 5.7×28mm / 40×46mm SR Grenade: In Development)
 Rifles
 SAR-21	(Republic of Singapore - Assault Rifle - 5.56×45mm NATO)
 SAR-21 GL	(Republic of Singapore - Assault Rifle with Grenade Launcher - 5.56×45mm NATO / 40×46mm Grenade)
 SAR-21 with CIS GL 40	(Republic of Singapore - Assault Rifle with Grenade Launcher - 5.56×45mm NATO / 40×46mm Grenade)
 SAR-21 GL with M203	(Republic of Singapore - Assault Rifle with Grenade Launcher - 5.56×45mm NATO / 40×46mm SR Grenade)
 SAR-21 Lightweight Carbine	(Republic of Singapore - Carbine - 5.56×45mm NATO)
 SAR-21 LMG	(Republic of Singapore - Squad Automatic Weapon - 5.56×45mm NATO)
 SAR-21 MMS	(Republic of Singapore - Assault Rifle - 5.56×45mm NATO)
 SAR-21 MMS Tactical	(Republic of Singapore - Assault Rifle - 5.56×45mm NATO)
 SAR-21 P-Rail	(Republic of Singapore - Assault Rifle - 5.56×45mm NATO)
 SAR-21 RCF	(Republic of Singapore - Assault Rifle - 5.56×45mm NATO)
 SAR-21 Sharpshooter	(Republic of Singapore - Assault Rifle - 5.56×45mm NATO)
 SAR-21A	(Republic of Singapore - Assault Rifle - 5.56×45mm NATO)
 SAR-80	(Republic of Singapore - Assault Rifle - 5.56×45mm NATO)
 SAR-87	(Republic of Singapore, United Kingdom - Assault Rifle - 5.56×45mm NATO)
 Stoeger Industries
 Shotguns
 Stoeger Coach Gun	(Federative Republic of Brazil - Unknown - Side-By-Side Shotgun - .410 Bore, 20 Gauge, 12 Gauge)
 Stoeger Coach Gun Double Defense	(Federative Republic of Brazil - Unknown - Side-By-Side Shotgun - .410 Bore, 20 Gauge, 12 Gauge)
 Stoeger Coach Gun Double Supreme	(Federative Republic of Brazil - Unknown - Side-By-Side Shotgun - .410 Bore, 20 Gauge, 12 Gauge)
 Stoeger Condor Outback	(Federative Republic of Brazil - Unknown - Break-Action Over-And-Under Shotgun - 20 Gauge, 12 Gauge)
 Stoeger Condor Supreme	(Federative Republic of Brazil - Unknown - Break-Action Over-And-Under Shotgun - .410 Bore, 20 Gauge, 16 Gauge, 12 Gauge)
 Stoner 63	(United States - 1962 - Assault Rifle - 5.56×45mm NATO)
 Stoner M96W	(United States - 1962 - Battle Rifle - 7.62×51mm NATO: Prototype)
 Stoner 62	(United States - 1962 - Battle Rifle - 7.62×51mm NATO: Prototype)
 Stoner 63 Survival Rifle	(United States - 1964 - Carbine - 5.56×45mm NATO: Prototype)
 Stoner 63A	(United States - 1967 - Assault Rifle - 5.56×45mm NATO)
 XM22E1	(United States - 1967 - Squad Automatic Weapon - 5.56×45mm NATO: Prototype)
 Stoner 63A Automatic Rifle	(United States - 1967 - Assault Rifle - 5.56×45mm NATO)
 Stoner 63A Carbine	(United States - 1967 - Carbine - 5.56×45mm NATO)
 XM23	(United States - 1967 - Carbine - 5.56×45mm NATO: Prototype)
 Stoner 63A Commando/Mk 23 Mod 0	(United States - 1967 - Squad Automatic Weapon - 5.56×45mm NATO)
 Stoner 63A Fixed Machine Gun	(United States - 1967 - Squad Automatic Weapon - 5.56×45mm NATO)
 Stoner 63A LMG	(United States - 1967 - Squad Automatic Weapon - 5.56×45mm NATO)
 XM207E1	(United States - 1967 - Squad Automatic Weapon - 5.56×45mm NATO: Prototype)
 XM207E2	(United States - 1967 - Squad Automatic Weapon - 5.56×45mm NATO: Prototype)
 Stoner 63A MMG	(United States - 1967 - Medium Machine Gun, Squad Automatic Weapon - 5.56×45mm NATO)
 XM22	(United States - 1967 - Squad Automatic Weapon - 5.56×45mm NATO: Prototype)
 Stoner 86	(United States - 1986 - Light Machine Gun - 5.56×45mm NATO)
 Strayer-Voight Infinity	(United States - Unknown - Semi-Automatic Pistol - .40 S&W, .45 ACP)
 Sumitomo Heavy Industries
 Machine Guns
 NTK-62	(Japan - 1962 - General-Purpose Machine Gun - 7.62×51mm NATO)
 Type 74 Machine Gun	(Japan - 1974 - APC-Mounted General-Purpose Machine Gun - 7.62×51mm NATO)
 Sumitomo M249	(Japan - Light Machine Gun - 5.56×45mm NATO)
 Suomi KP/-31	(Republic of Finland - 1931 - Submachine Gun - 9×19mm Parabellum)
 SVT-40	(Soviet Union - 1940 - Semi-Automatic Rifle - 7.62×54mmR)
 AVT-40	(Soviet Union - 1942 - Battle Rifle - 7.62×54mmR)
 SKT-40	(Soviet Union - 1940 - Semi-Automatic Carbine - 7.62×54mmR)
 SKT-40 7.62×39mm Variant	(Soviet Union - 1940 - Semi-Automatic Rifle - 7.62×39mm: Prototype)
 SVT-38	(Soviet Union - 1938 - Semi-Automatic Rifle - 7.62×54mmR)
 SVT-40 Sniper Variant	(Soviet Union - 1940 - Semi-Automatic Sniper Rifle - 7.62×54mmR)
 Swedish Armed Forces Small Arms Designations
 Rifles
 Psg 90	(Sweden/United Kingdom of Great Britain and Northern Ireland - Swedish Armed Forces/Accuracy International - 1991 - Bolt-Action Sniper Rifle - 7.62×51mm NATO, .308 Winchester: Swedish variant of the British Accuracy International Arctic Warfare bolt-action sniper rifle. Features a Hensoldt telescopic sight.)

See also
 List of firearms by era
 List of pre-20th century firearms
 List of World War II firearms
 List of firearms by country
 List of modern Russian small arms
 Lists of firearms by actions
 List of blow-forward firearms
 List of delayed-blowback firearms
 List of firearms by type
 List of assault rifles
 List of battle rifles
 List of carbines
 List of firearm brands
 List of flamethrowers
 List of machine guns
 List of multiple-barrel firearms
 List of pistols
 List of shotguns
 List of sniper rifles
 List of submachine guns
 List of firearm cartridges
 List of handgun cartridges
 List of rifle cartridges
 List of semi-automatic firearms
 List of semi-automatic pistols
 List of semi-automatic rifles
 List of semi-automatic shotguns
 List of most-produced firearms

References

S